Charles Cresson (March 23, 1874 – February 27, 1949) was an American tennis player. He competed in the men's singles and doubles events at the 1904 Summer Olympics.

References

1874 births
1949 deaths
American male tennis players
Olympic tennis players of the United States
Tennis players at the 1904 Summer Olympics
Sportspeople from San Antonio
Tennis people from Texas